Stella Tembisa Ndabeni-Abrahams (born 30 June 1978) is a South African politician and the Minister of Small Business Development in the cabinet of Cyril Ramaphosa. She previously served as Minister of Communications and Digital Technologies and Deputy Minister of Communication. Ndabeni-Abrahams is a member of the African National Congress (ANC) and serves as a member of the party's Provincial Executive Committee (PEC) and Provincial Working Committee (PWC) in the Eastern Cape.

Early life
Ndabeni-Abrahams was born in Sakhela, a village near Mthatha, in 1978. She is the first-born of six children in her family and her parents were pastors. She completed her secondary school education at the Holy Cross Senior Secondary School in Mthatha.

Career
Ndabeni-Abrahams is a recipient of an Advanced Certificate in Project Management, Rhodes University; Commonwealth Telecommunications Organisation Diploma in Telecommunications and Management Systems; a Certificate in Telecommunications, Policy and Regulation Management from Wits University, as well as a Project Management Diploma from Cranefields College.

She was previously the Deputy Minister of the Department of Communications (DoC) from 26 May 2014 to 30 March 2017. Prior to the 2014 elections, she held the same position in the then DoC (now Department of Telecommunications and Postal Services) from 25 October 2011 until 25 May 2014. Prior to being an MP, Ms Ndabeni-Abrahams was a Project Manager for the Eastern Cape Socio-Economic Consultative Council from 2003 to 2009. On November 22, 2018, she was appointed as Minister of Communications, Telecommunications and Postal Services and had overseen the unification of the two ministries.

Controversy

Yekani allegation 
In 2020 the Sunday Times reported that the East London based electronics firm, Yekani, was forced into liquidation because its owner, Siphiwe Cele, refused to sell a controlling stake in the company to Ndabeni-Abrahams' husband. At the time of the alleged offer in April 2018 Ndabeni-Abrahams was deputy minister of communications. In the article Cele is quoted stating that this resulted in the company not receiving financial support from the Eastern Cape Government leading its liquidation and the shuttering of the factory, resulting in the loss of 500 jobs. A spokes person for Ndabeni-Abrahams stated that it was "disingenuous" to blame Yekani's financial problems on the minister's husband. Yekani later refuted Cele's statement.

Covid-19 sanctioning by the President 
Around 7 April 2020, amidst the 21-day national lockdown due to the COVID-19 pandemic in South Africa, Ndabeni-Abrahams was at the center of a nationwide controversy after ANC NEC member Mduduzi Manana posted a photo online of them having lunch together. Manana captioned the (subsequently-deleted) picture: "It was great to host a former colleague and dear sister Cde Stella Ndabeni- Abrahams (Minister of Communication and Digital Technologies) on her way back from executing critical and essential services required for the effective functioning of our country during the nationwide lockdown". She was immediately criticized for ignoring lockdown regulations. 

President Cyril Ramaphosa then summoned her to explain to him why she appeared to have broken lockdown regulations and directed her to deliver a public apology to the nation. Ndabeni-Abrahams released a video apology, directed to the President and the country. Ramaphosa accepted the minister's apology for the violation, but in a statement said he "was unmoved by mitigating factors she tendered". Ndabeni-Abrahams was temporarily relieved of her duties for two months, with one month unpaid. She paid a R1,000 fine and now has a criminal record.

On 5 August 2021, president Ramaphosa reshuffled the national executive and appointed Ndabeni-Abrahams as Minister of Small Business Development, replacing Khumbudzo Ntshavheni, who took over as Minister of Communications and Digital Technologies.

Personal life
Stella Ndabeni-Abrahams has three children and is married to Thato Abrahams.

See also

African Commission on Human and Peoples' Rights
Constitution of South Africa
History of the African National Congress
Politics in South Africa
Provincial governments of South Africa

References

External links
 

Living people
1978 births
African National Congress politicians
Communications ministers of South Africa
Members of the National Assembly of South Africa
People from Mthatha
People from the Eastern Cape
21st-century South African politicians
21st-century South African women politicians
Women government ministers of South Africa